Brescia "Gabriele D'Annunzio" Airport, also known as Montichiari Airport, is located in Montichiari, southeast of City of Brescia, Italy. Other nearby airports are Milan-Malpensa, Milan-Linate, Bergamo Orio al Serio and Verona-Villafranca.

History
The airport is on the site of Italy's first air race meeting in September 1909, and the first outside France. The meeting was attended by the aviators Louis Blériot and Glenn Curtiss, among others. Gabriele D'Annunzio flew in one of Curtiss's planes and drew on the experience of the meeting in his novel Forse che sì forse che no (1910). Franz Kafka and Max Brod also attended and separately published accounts.

Ryanair operated scheduled flights to and from London Stansted Airport and Cagliari-Elmas Airport until the end of October 2010, when the airline decided to move these flights to the nearby Verona-Villafranca Airport.
 
Passenger traffic has collapsed from strong year on year growth in 2007–2008, from almost 35,000 passengers a month in June 2008   to only 311 passengers in June 2013, a drop of 99% over 5 years.

Airlines and destinations

Passenger

As of December 2022 there haven't been scheduled passenger services at the airport since July 2018.

Cargo

Statistics

Ground transportation 
On 20 May 2016, APAM (Transport for Mantova) began operation of a twice-weekly shuttle bus service between Brescia-Montichiari Airport to Brescia Santa Eufemia metro station, for onward connections to Brescia railway station. The bus journey takes 20 minutes and operates only on Mondays and Fridays.

References

External links 

 
 

Airports in Lombardy
Buildings and structures in Brescia
Transport in Lombardy